Gardnerella vaginalis is a species of Gram-variable-staining facultative anaerobic bacteria. The organisms are small (1.0–1.5 μm in diameter) non-spore-forming, nonmotile coccobacilli.

Once classified as Haemophilus vaginalis and afterwards as Corynebacterium vaginalis, G. vaginalis grows as small, circular, convex, gray colonies on chocolate agar; it also grows on  agar. A selective medium for G. vaginalis is colistin-oxolinic acid blood agar.

Clinical significance
G. vaginalis is a facultatively anaerobic Gram-variable rod that is involved, together with many other bacteria, mostly anaerobic,  in bacterial vaginosis in some women as a result of a disruption in the normal vaginal microflora. The resident facultative anaerobic Lactobacillus population in the vagina is responsible for the acidic environment. Once the anaerobes have supplanted the normal vaginal bacteria, prescription antibiotics with anaerobic coverage may have to be given to re-establish the equilibrium of the ecosystem. G. vaginalis  is not considered the cause of the bacterial vaginosis, but a signal organism of the altered microbial ecology associated with overgrowth of many bacterial species.

While typically isolated in genital cultures, it may also be detected in other samples from blood, urine, and the pharynx. Although G. vaginalis is a major species present in bacterial vaginosis, it can also be isolated from women without any signs or symptoms of infection.

It has a Gram-positive cell wall, but, because the cell wall is so thin, it can appear either Gram-positive or Gram-negative under the microscope. It is associated microscopically with clue cells, which are epithelial cells covered in bacteria.

G. vaginalis produces a pore-forming toxin, vaginolysin, which affects only human cells.

Protease and sialidase enzyme activities frequently accompany G. vaginalis.

Treatment
Methods of antibiotic treatment include metronidazole and clindamycin, in both oral and vaginal gel/cream forms.

The effectiveness of treating bacterial vaginosis with antibiotics is well documented, however relapse is not uncommon.

Symptoms
G. vaginalis is associated with bacterial vaginosis, which may be asymptomatic, or may have symptoms including vaginal discharge, vaginal irritation, and a "fish-like" odor. In the amine whiff test, 10% KOH is added to the discharge; a positive result is indicated if a fishy smell is produced.  This and other tests can be used to distinguish between vaginal symptoms related to G. vaginalis and those caused by other organisms, such as Trichomonas and Candida albicans, which are similar and may require different treatment.  Trichomonas vaginalis and G. vaginalis have similar clinical presentations and can cause a frothy gray or yellow-green vaginal discharge, pruritus, and produce a positive "whiff-test".  The two can be distinguished using a wet-mount slide, where a swab of the vaginal epithelium is diluted and then placed onto a slide for observation under a microscope.  Gardnerella reveals a classic "clue cell" under the microscope, showing bacteria adhering to the surface of squamous epithelial cells.

See also
 List of bacterial vaginosis microbiota

References

External links

 
 Type strain of Gardnerella vaginalis at BacDive -  the Bacterial Diversity Metadatabase

Bifidobacteriales
Bacterial diseases
Infections with a predominantly sexual mode of transmission
Bacterial vaginosis
Bacteria described in 1955